Ectoderm-neural cortex protein 2 is a protein that in humans is encoded by the KLHL25 gene.

References

Further reading

Kelch proteins